Patrick James King (born 1978 or 1979) is a Canadian far-right activist and conspiracy theorist from Sault Ste. Marie, Ontario, who lives near Red Deer, Alberta.

He is known for protesting COVID-19 mandates. He has led the Wexit movement advocating for secession from Canada of Alberta and other western provinces, led the United We Roll movement, and acted as a regional organizer for the Canada convoy protest.

King was arrested on February 18, 2022, at the Canada convoy protests in Ottawa and faces multiple charges. He was released on bail on July 18, 2022.

Activism and demonstration 
King is highly active on social media.

Western Canada secessionism 
In 2019, King was an organizer of the Wexit movement that advocated for Canada's prairie provinces to secede.

United We Roll 

King was a co-organizer, and a driver for the United We Roll yellow vest protest in 2019 and spoke of the importance of a gas pipeline, and the employment benefits of the oil and gas industry. He also spoke of the national benefit of the Albertan economy and the lack of support to Albertans in 2019. King later stated that the Canadian Broadcasting Corporation distorted the messages of the movement.

Alberta anti-racist counter protest 
King was part of a right-wing counter protest to an anti-racist demonstration in Red Deer in 2020 where he was noted for saying: "That’s patriots kicking antifa out of their towns!"

In September 2020, he organized a second counter-protest in Ponoka and threatened violence against anti-racist protests who he characterized as Antifa.

COVID-19 pandemic in Canada 

In August 2021, King and Chris Sky visited Moose Jaw, Saskatchewan and spoke as part of a No-Vaxx Pass tour, in which they advocated for Canadians to defy the rules about vaccine passports. Also in August, King incorrectly claimed that his actions led to easing of COVID-19 public health measures in Alberta. His misunderstanding was a result of him misreading court documents rejecting his appeal against a parking ticket. This led to the Justice Centre for Constitutional Freedoms stating that: "It is unclear whether Mr. King fully understands the legal process he is involved in."

In October 2021, King broadcast a video, falsely claiming that the Canadian military had set up a base at Black Lake Denesuline First Nation and were forcing COVID-19 vaccinations on women and children. The video went viral, resulting in pressure upon the Athabasca Health Authority and the Federation of Sovereign Indigenous Nations to put out statements, correcting the misinformation.

In November 2021, King claimed there was no evidence that COVID-19 exists, in a social media message. In December, King said of the public health measures: "The only way this is going to be solved is with bullets."

2021 Federal election 
King has accused Canadian Prime Minister Justin Trudeau of stealing the 2021 Canadian federal election and in the lead up to the Canada convoy protest advised his social media followers to stock up on food and supplies as preparation for "what's coming".

Canada convoy protest 
King was a regional organizer and one of the highest profile promoters of the 2022 Canada convoy protest in Ottawa. Responding to a question about the impact of noise on Ottawa residents, King expressed amusement. In the lead up to the Ottawa protest, MP Jeremy Patzer stated that he had no association with King after meeting him as the protest convoy passed through Swift Current.

King was arrested on February 18, 2022.

Arrest, charges, and detention 
King was arrested on February 18, 2022, during the convoy protests as part of a police operation aimed at peacefully ending the occupation. He broadcast the arrest via his Facebook page. He was charged with mischief, counselling to commit mischief, perjury, obstruction of justice, counselling to disobey a court order, and counselling to obstruct police. He was held in the Ottawa-Carleton Detention Centre.

King was denied bail after the Justice of the Peace determined that there was a substantive likelihood of King reoffending given his criminal history and the overwhelming case presented by the Crown. His lawyer had argued for bail due to the risk that King could catch COVID-19 in jail while awaiting trial. This prompted the judge to address the irony of the situation: "an individual whose raison d'etre is to protest vehemently against public health measures designed to reduce the spread of COVID, would now suggest that the delay or the potential for being infected at a detention centre could impact the court's decision."

On March 24, 2022, an additional four charges were laid against King, who is now co-accused with Tyson George Billings, bringing the new total to ten charges: two counts of obstructing police, two counts of intimidation, one count of counselling intimidation, one count of disobeying a court order, counselling to commit mischief, mischief, counselling to disobey a court order, and counselling to obstruct police. King was granted bail on 18 July 2022, and forbidden from using social media, contacting convoy leaders, or organising convoy-related protests. King's lawyer, Natasha Calvinho, anticipates that his criminal trial will occur in the fall of 2023.

Views and conspiracy theories 
King has a history of anti-Muslim, white nationalist, and far-right conspiracy theories. He has shared videos online promoting the white genocide conspiracy theory, including saying on social media "There’s an endgame: It’s called depopulation of the Caucasian race."

In 2020, King had a conversation with the Toronto Star in which he shared conflicting views about violence and "ranted" about left wing ideologies, Antifa, and cancel culture.

King accused the government of Canada of permitting Islamic State terrorists to enter Canada as refugees, of "normalizing pedophilia", and of adopting an immigration policy to “depopulate the white, Anglo-Saxon race.” He has advocated against a carbon tax, arguing that it puts Canadians at an economic disadvantage.

King has said that the only way to end Canadian public health measures against COVID-19 may be achieved "with bullets". King also commented that Justin Trudeau was going to catch a bullet.

In 2021, he claimed that The Holocaust death toll of 6 million was overstated.

Personal life 
King was born in 1978 or 1979 in Sault Ste. Marie, Ontario. King lives in Innisfail, Alberta, near Red Deer.

King has claimed Métis heritage, although that claim has been challenged by the Métis community.

See also
 Tamara Lich
 Christopher John Barber
 Tom Marazzo
 Chris Sky
 COVID-19 pandemic in Canada
 COVID-19 protests in Canada

References 

Living people
COVID-19 pandemic in Canada
Canadian conspiracy theorists
COVID-19 conspiracy theorists
Canadian anti-vaccination activists
Activists from Alberta
Activists from Ontario
Far-right politics in Canada
People from Red Deer County
People from Sault Ste. Marie, Ontario
Canadian white nationalists
Social media influencers
Yellow vest activists
Year of birth missing (living people)
Protesters involved in the Canada convoy protest